Ken Goodwin may refer to:
 Ken Goodwin (comedian) (1933–2012), English comedian
 Ken Goodwin (academic) (1934–2014), Australian academic
 Ken Goodwin (RAF officer), British pilot, Air Force Commander in 74 Squadron RAF from 1966 to 1969
 Ken Goodwin (field hockey) (born 1961), Canadian former field hockey goalkeeper